Jolanta Dukure (born 20 September 1979) is a Latvian race walker. She is the Latvian record holder in 5000 m on track and 5 km, 10 km, 20 km, 30 km and 50 km on road.

Achievements

References

External links
 
 
 
 

1979 births
Living people
Latvian female racewalkers
Athletes from Riga
Athletes (track and field) at the 2000 Summer Olympics
Athletes (track and field) at the 2008 Summer Olympics
Olympic athletes of Latvia